White Caribbean or European Caribbean is the term for people who are born in the Caribbean whose ancestors are from Europe or people who emigrated to the Caribbean from Europe and had acquired citizenship in their respective Caribbean countries. White Caribbeans include:

 Béké
 White Bahamians
 White Barbadians
 White Bermudians
 White Dominicans (Dominica)
 White Dominicans (Dominican Republic)
 White Guyanese
Portuguese Guyanese
 White Haitians
 French Haitians
 German Haitians
 Italian Haitians
 Polish Haitians
 White Jamaicans
 German Jamaicans
 Irish Jamaicans
 Scottish Jamaicans
 Spanish Jamaicans
 White Kittitians and Nevisians
 White Puerto Ricans
 White Surinamese
 Dutch Surinamese
 Portuguese Surinamese
 White Trinidadians and Tobagonians
 Portuguese Trinidadians and Tobagonians

History 
The first Europeans to arrive in the Caribbean were Spaniards who discovered Hispaniola. Many white people in the Caribbean owned Afro-Caribbean slaves. Many whites came to the Caribbean during the colonial era.

See also 

 Redleg
 White people
 History of the Caribbean
 History of the Jews in Latin America and the Caribbean
 Afro-Caribbeans
 Caribbean people

References 

 
Ethnic groups in the Caribbean
White Caribbean